Petitia, called the bastard stopper, is a genus of flowering plants in the mint family, Lamiaceae, first described in 1760. It contains two known species, native to Florida and the West Indies.

Species
 Petitia domingensis Jacq. - Bahamas, Cayman Islands, Cuba, Hispaniola, Jamaica, Puerto Rico, Leeward Islands, Miami-Dade County in Florida 
 Petitia urbanii Ekman. - Cuba, Tortuga Island in Haiti

References

External links

Lamiaceae
Lamiaceae genera